Procambarus acherontis, the Orlando cave crayfish, is a species of crayfish in the family Cambaridae. It is endemic to Orange County and Seminole County, Florida, and is listed as an endangered species on the IUCN Red List.

References

Cambaridae
Endemic fauna of Florida
Freshwater crustaceans of North America
Cave crayfish
Crustaceans described in 1894
Taxonomy articles created by Polbot